The 1948 Washington Homestead Grays baseball team represented the Washington Homestead Grays in the Negro National League (NNL) during the 1948 baseball season. It was their fifteenth and final season played under the league, which disbanded after the season ended. It was the eleventh and final season managed by Vic Harris. The team compiled a 56–24–2 record (44–23–1 against NNL opponents) and finished first in the NNL for the tenth time in franchise history. They then beat the Baltimore Elite Giants in the Championship Series to win their ninth league pennant. They faced the Birmingham Black Barons in the 1948 Negro World Series and won the Series in five games for their third World Series title. The team, losing people such as Harris after 1948 ended, would disband in 1950.

The team played its home games at Forbes Field in Pittsburgh and Griffith Stadium in Washington, D.C. 

The team's leading batters were:
 Right fielder Bob Thurman - .307 batting average, .438 slugging percentage in 38 games
 Left fielder Luke Easter - .304 batting average, .418 on-base percentage, .514 slugging percentage, five home runs, 32 RBIs in 39 games
 Catcher Eudie Napier - .302 batting average, .430 slugging percentage in 31 games
 Center fielder Luis Márquez - .282 batting average, .371 on-base percentage, .417 slugging percentage in 39 games
 First baseman Buck Leonard - .265 batting average, .434 slugging percentage in 35 games

The team's leading pitchers were Wilmer Fields (6–1, 2.89 ERA, 26 strikeouts) and Tom Parker (6–2, 2.78 ERA, 44 strikeouts).

References

1948 in sports in Pennsylvania
Negro league baseball seasons